Pacharauta (Nepali: पचरौता ) is a municipality in Bara District in Province No. 2 of South-Eastern Nepal. It was formed in 2016 occupying current 9 sections (wards) from previous 9 former VDCs. It occupies an area of 44.01 km2 with a total population of 34,175.

Farming is the main occupation of the people of this municipality. Some of the people are also involved in government service and small home trade. India (Bihar Boarder) is in the south of this Municipality.

Geography
Pachrauta municipality border by India with East Champaran of Bihar State in South while in North Adarsh Kotwali Gaupalika, KaraiyaMai Gaupalika and Baragadhi Nagarpalika, in East Adarsh Kotwali Gaupalika and Simraungarh Nagrpalika while in West Suwarn Gaupalika, Mahagadhi Mai and India with East Champaran of Bihar State.

Climate

It has hot climate with average rainfall of  2 cm. People spend very simple livelihood .It has good progress in the development. According to Census 2011, 8535 households with the population of 40,282; 22,040 males and 18,042 females with an average household size of 4.72. The geographic location of Pachrauta Municipality is 26° 51′ 36″ N, latitude and 85° 4′ 48″ E, longitudes.

Health
According to Ministry of Health, there are No any health institutions in Pacharauta Municipality.

Municipal Income and Expenditure
Government of Nepal has allocated 363.459 million Nepali Rupees for fiscal year 2017.

Educational Status 
The overall literacy rate (for population age 5 years and above) increased from 90.9% in 2017 to 99.5% in 2019. The male literacy rate was 99.3% compared to the female literacy rate of 79.4%. There is one Government School (Shree Nepal Rastiya Secondary School Piparpati) near Piparpati market, where studying up to bachelor's degree in Education (B.Ed), and Intermediate in Education (I.Ed) and also very soon there will be start Science and Mathematics. From last 4 (Four) Years, 2016 in this also a Technical Education class is in the process. This Technical Education class Verify and monitored by CTEVT Nepal. The course start form class 9th to 12th (Full 4 year Computer Engineering Course).

Following are the Educational institutes in this municipality.

 Shree Nepal Rastriya Secondary School, Pachrauta 1, Piparpati
 Shree Nepal Rsatriya Secondary School, Pachrauta 4, Beldari
 Shree Nepal Rastriya Secondary School, Pachrauta 7, Benauli
 Shree Nepal Rastriya Middle Secondary School, Pachrauta 6, Pakadiya
 Shree Nepal Rastriya Primary School, Pachrauta 1, Piparpati
 Gyandeep English Boarding School, Pachrauta 1, Piparpati
 Progress English Boarding School, Pachrauta 1, Piparpati
 Shree New Kankali English Boarding School, Pachrauta 7, Benauli
 Shree Nepal Rastriya Primary School, Pachrauta 5, Gulariya
 Shree Nepal Rastriya Primary School, Pachrauta 7, Sakhuwat
 Shree Nepal Rastriya Primary School, Pachrauta 7, Bhawanipur
 Shree Jan Chetna Primary School, Pachrauta 7, Bharmnagar
 Shree Nepal Rastriya Middle Secondary School, Pachrauta 9, Kudawa
 Shree Nepal Rastriya Primary School, Pachrauta 9, Baldushwa
 Shree Nepal Rastriya Primary School, Pachrauta 8, Amarpati
 Shree Bal tatha Mahila Primary School, Pachrauta 8, Amarpati
 Shree Nepal Rastriya Primary School, Pachrauta 8, Amarpati Bajopati
 Shree Nepal Rastriya Primary School, Pachrauta 3, Ramnagar
 Shree Nepal Rastriya Middle Secondary School, Pachrauta 3, Bhathi Tola
 Shree Nepal Rastriya Primary School, Pachrauta 2, Bargachhi
 Shree Nepal Rastriya Primary School, Pachrauta 2, Shrinagar Bairiya
 Shree Dalit Primary School, Pachrauta 1, Harpur
 Shree Gobind Baba Primary School, Pachrauta 1, Piparpati
 Shree Nepal Rastriya Primary School, Pachrauta 2, Bisunpur

Wards

Merged VDC

Ward No. 1 

Ward Office: - Piparpati Pachrauta

Includes VDC:- Piparpati Pachrauta (Ward 1 - 9)

Total Area: - 3.43 (Square K.M.)

Total Population: - 5033 (2011)

Ward Contact Person Name, Post, and Contact

Ward No. 2 
Ward Office: - Sri Nagar Bairiya

Includes VDC: - Bisunpur (Ward 1 & 2) and Sri Nagar Bairiya (Ward 3 & 7)

Total Area: 3.87 (Square K.M.)

Total Population: - 3555 (2011)

Ward Contact Person Name, Post, and Contact

Ward No. 3 
Ward Office: - Sri Nagar Bairiya

Includes Vdc: - Sri Nagar Bairiya (Ward 1, 2, 8 & 9)

Total Area: - 4.58 (Square K.M.)

Total Population: - 2566 (2011)

Ward Contact Person Name, Post, and Contact

Ward No. 4 
Ward Office: - Beldari

Includes Vdc: - Beldari (Ward 1, 2, 3, 4 & 9) and Pakadiya Chikani (Ward 9)

Total Area: - 4.12 (Square K.M.)

Total Population: - 3306 (2011)

Ward Contact Person Name, Post, and Contact

Ward No. 5 
Ward Office: - Beldari

Includes Vdc: - Beldari (Ward 5 & 8) and Pakadiya Chikani (Ward 1 & 8)

Total Area: - 4.38 (Square K.M.)

Total Population: - 3344 (2011)

Ward Contact Person Name, Post, and Contact

Ward No. 6 
Ward Office: - Pakadiya Chikani

Includes Vdc: - Pakadiya Chikani (Ward 2 & 7)

Total Area: - 4.18 (Square K.M.)

Total Population: - 3360 (2011)

Ward Contact Person Name, Post, and Contact

Ward No. 7 
Ward Office: - Benauli

Includes Vdc: - Benauli (Ward 1 - 9)

Total Area: - 7.62 (Square K.M.)

Total Population: - 5110 (2011)

Ward Contact Person Name, Post, and Contact

Ward No. 8 
Ward Office: - Amarpati

Includes Vdc: - Amarpati (Ward 1 - 9)

Total Area: - 6.48 (Square K.M.)

Total Population: - 3738 (2011)

Ward Contact Person Name, Post, and Contact

Ward No. 9 
Ward Office: - Kudwa

Includes Vdc: - Kudwa (Ward 1 - 9)

Total Area: - 5.07 (Square K.M.)

Total Population: - 4463 (2011)

Ward Contact Person Name, Post, and Contact

References 

Populated places in Bara District
Nepal municipalities established in 2017
Municipalities in Madhesh Province